Jacqueline Woodson (born February 12, 1963) is an American writer of books for children and adolescents. She is best known for Miracle's Boys, and her Newbery Honor-winning titles Brown Girl Dreaming, After Tupac and D Foster, Feathers, and Show Way. After serving as the Young People's Poet Laureate from 2015 to 2017, she was named the National Ambassador for Young People's Literature, by the Library of Congress, for 2018–19. She was named a MacArthur Fellow in 2020.

Early years
Jacqueline Woodson was born in Columbus, Ohio, and lived in Nelsonville, Ohio, before her family moved south. During her early years she lived in Greenville, South Carolina, before moving to Brooklyn at about the age of seven. She also states where she lives in her autobiography, Brown Girl Dreaming.
As a child, Woodson enjoyed telling stories and always knew she wanted to be a writer. Her favorite books when she was young were Hans Christian Andersen's "The Little Match Girl" and Mildred D. Taylor's Roll of Thunder, Hear My Cry.

Writing career

After college, Woodson went to work for Kirchoff/Wohlberg, a children's packaging company. She helped to write the California standardized reading tests and caught the attention of Liza Pulitzer-Voges, a children's book agent at the same company. Although the partnership did not work out, it did get Woodson's first manuscript out of a drawer. She then enrolled in Bunny Gable's children's book writing class at The New School, where Bebe Willoughby, an editor at Delacorte, heard a reading from Last Summer with Maizon and requested the manuscript. Delacorte bought the manuscript, but Willoughby left the company before editing it and so Wendy Lamb took over and saw Woodson's first.

Inspirations
Woodson's youth was split between South Carolina and Brooklyn. In her interview with Jennifer M. Brown she remembered: "The South was so lush and so slow-moving and so much about community. The city was thriving and fast-moving and electric. Brooklyn was so much more diverse: on the block where I grew up, there were German people, people from the Dominican Republic, people from Puerto Rico, African-Americans from the South, Caribbean-Americans, Asians."

When asked to name her literary influences in an interview with journalist Hazel Rochman, Woodson responded: "Two major writers for me are James Baldwin and Virginia Hamilton. It blew me away to find out Virginia Hamilton was a sister like me. Later, Nikki Giovanni had a similar effect on me. I feel that I learned how to write from Baldwin. He was onto some future stuff, writing about race and gender long before people were comfortable with those dialogues. He would cross class lines all over the place, and each of his characters was remarkably believable. I still pull him down from my shelf when I feel stuck." Other early influences included Toni Morrison's The Bluest Eye and Sula, and the work of Rosa Guy, as well as her high-school English teacher, Mr. Miller. Louise Meriwether was also named.

Style
As an author, Woodson's known for the detailed physical landscapes she writes into each of her books. She places boundaries everywhere—social, economic, physical, sexual, racial—then has her characters break through both the physical and psychological boundaries to create a strong and emotional story. She is also known for her optimism. She has said that she dislikes books that do not offer hope. She has offered the novel Sounder as an example of a "bleak" and "hopeless" novel. On the other hand, she enjoyed A Tree Grows in Brooklyn. Even though the family was exceptionally poor, the characters experienced "moments of hope and sheer beauty". She uses this philosophy in her own writing, saying: "If you love the people you create, you can see the hope there."

As a writer she consciously writes for a younger audience. There are authors who write about adolescence or from a youth's point of view, but their work is intended for adult audiences. Woodson writes about childhood and adolescence with an audience of youth in mind. In an interview on National Public Radio (NPR) she said, "I'm writing about adolescents for adolescents. And I think the main difference is when you're writing to a particular age group, especially a younger age group, you're — the writing can't be as implicit. You're more in the moment. They don't have the adult experience from which to look back. So you're in the moment of being an adolescent ... and the immediacy and the urgency is very much on the page, because that's what it feels like to be an adolescent. Everything is so important, so big, so traumatic. And all of that has to be in place for them."

Teaching
Woodson has, in turn, influenced many other writers, including An Na, who credits her as being her first writing teacher. She also teaches teens at the National Book Foundation's summer writing camp where she co-edits the annual anthology of their combined work. She was also a visiting fellow at the American Library in Paris in spring of 2017.

Themes

Some reviewers have labeled Woodson's writings as "issue-related", but she believes that her books address universal questions. She has tackled subjects that were not commonly discussed when her books were published, including interracial couples, teenage pregnancy and homosexuality. She often does this with sympathetic characters put into realistic situations. Woodson states that her interests lie in exploring many different perspectives through her writings, not in forcing her views onto others.

Woodson has several themes that appear in many of her novels. She explores issues of gender, class and race as well as family and history. She is known for using these common themes in ground-breaking ways. While many of her characters are given labels that make them "invisible" to society, Woodson is most often writing about their search for self rather than a search for equality or social justice.

Gender
Only The Notebooks of Melanin Sun, Miracle's Boys and Locomotion are written from a male perspective. The rest of Woodson's works feature female narrators. However, her 2009  small story "Trev", published in How Beautiful the Ordinary: Twelve Stories of Identity, features a transgender male narrator.

African-American society and history

In her 2003 novel, Coming on Home Soon, she explores both race and gender within the historical context of World War II.

The Other Side is a poetic look at race through two young girls, one black and one white, who sit on either side of the fence that separates their worlds.

In November 2014, Daniel Handler, the master of ceremonies at the National Book Awards, made a joke about watermelons when Woodson received an award. In a New York Times Op-Ed published shortly thereafter, "The Pain of the Watermelon Joke," Woodson explained that "in making light of that deep and troubled history" with his joke, Daniel Handler had come from a place of ignorance. She underscored the need for her mission to "give people a sense of this country's brilliant and brutal history, so no one ever thinks they can walk onto a stage one evening and laugh at another's too often painful past."

Red at the Bone (2019), a novel, weaves together stories of three generations of one Black family, including the trauma resulting from the Tulsa Race Massacre and the September 11 attacks.

Economic status
The Dear One is notable for dealing with the differences between rich and poor within the black community.

Sexual identity
The House You Pass on the Way is a novel that touches on gay identity through the main characters of Staggerlee.

In The Dear One Woodson introduces a strongly committed lesbian relationship between Marion and Bernadette. She then contrasts it to the broken straight family that results in a teenager from Harlem named Rebecca moving in with them and their 12-year-old daughter, Feni.

Critical response
Last Summer with Maizon, Woodson's first book, was praised by critics for creating positive female characters and the touching portrayal of the close eleven-year-old friends. Reviewers also commented on its convincing sense of place and vivid character relationships. The next two books in the trilogy, Maizon at Blue Hill and Between Madison and Palmetto, were also well received for their realistic characters and strong writing style. The issues of self-esteem and identity are addressed throughout the three books. A few reviewers felt that there was a slight lack of focus as the trilogy touched lightly and quickly on too many different problems in too few pages.

Announcing her as recipient of the ALA Margaret A. Edwards Award in 2006, the citation of the panel of librarians chair stated: "Woodson's books are powerful, groundbreaking and very personal explorations of the many ways in which identity and friendship transcend the limits of stereotype."

In October 2020, Woodson won a MacArthur Fellowship, commonly known as a "Genius Grant." The MacArthur Foundation recognized her for "redefining children’s and young adult literature in works that reflect the complexity and diversity of the world we live in while stretching young readers’ intellectual abilities and capacity for empathy." Her books "evoke the hopefulness and power of human connection even as they tackle difficult issues." She has stated that she plans to use the grant money to expand Baldwin for the Arts, the residency program for people of color she founded.

Censorship
Some of the topics covered in Woodson's books raise flags for many censors. Homosexuality, child abuse, harsh language and other content have led to issues with censorship. In an interview on NPR Woodson said that she uses very few curse words in her books and that the issues adults have with her subject matter say more about what they are uncomfortable with than it does what their students should be thinking about. She suggests that people look at the various outside influences teens have access to today, then compare that to the subject matter in her books.

Personal life
Woodson lives in Park Slope, Brooklyn, with her partner Juliet Widoff, a physician. The couple have two children, a daughter named Toshi Georgianna and a son named Jackson-Leroi.

Awards and honors 

1995 Coretta Scott King Honor for I Hadn’t Meant to Tell You This
1996 Coretta Scott King Honor for From the Notebooks of Melanin Sun
2001 Coretta Scott King Award for "Miracle's Boys"
ALA Best Book for Young Adults in 1998, 2000, 2003, 2004 and 2005
2004 Coretta Scott King Honor for "Locomotion"
2005 YALSA Quick Picks for Reluctant Young Adult Readers for Behind You 
2006 Margaret A. Edwards Award
2006 Newbery Honor for Show Way
2008 Newbery Honor for  Feathers
2009 Newbery Honor for After Tupac and D Foster
2009 Josette Frank Award for After Tupac and D Foster 
2009 Pennsylvania Young Reader's Choice Awards for Peace Locomotion
2009 Keystone to Reading Book Award for Peace Locomotion
2013 Coretta Scott King Honor for Each Kindness
2013 Jane Addams Children's Book Award - Book for Younger Children for Each Kindness
2014 Hans Christian Andersen Award, U.S. nominee 
2014 National Book Award in Young People's Literature for Brown Girl Dreaming
2015 Coretta Scott King Award for Brown Girl Dreaming
2015 Young People's Poet Laureate by the Poetry Foundation
2015 Langston Hughes Medal
2015 Newbery Honor for Brown Girl Dreaming
2015 NAACP Image Award for Outstanding Literary Work In Youth/Teens Fiction for Brown Girl Dreaming
2015 Robert F. Sibert Honor for Brown Girl Dreaming
2017 May Hill Arbuthnot Honor Lecture at the American Library Association, recognizes significant contribution to children's literature.
2017 NAACP Image Award for Outstanding Literary Work In Fiction for Another Brooklyn
2018–19 National Ambassador for Young People's Literature for the Library of Congress.
2018 Astrid Lindgren Memorial Award
2018 Children’s Literature Legacy Award
2019 NAACP Image Award for Outstanding Literary Work In Youth/Teens for Harbor Me
2019 Jane Addams Children's Book Award - Book for Younger Children for The Day You Begin
2019 Nomination Goodread's Choice Award Best Fiction for Red at the Bone.
2020 Hans Christian Andersen Award, winner
2020 MacArthur Fellows Program Grant Award, winner

Complete works

Novels

 Autobiography of a Family Photo (1995)
 Another Brooklyn (2016)
 Red at the Bone (2019)

Middle grade titles 

 Last Summer with Maizon (1990)
 Maizon at Blue Hill (1992)
 Between Madison and Palmetto (1993)
 Feathers (2007)
 After Tupac and D Foster (2008)
 Peace Locomotion (2009)
 Locomotion (2010), verse novel
 Brown Girl Dreaming (2014), verse novel
Harbor Me (2018)
Before the Ever After (2020)

Young adult titles 

 The Dear One (1990)
 I Hadn't Meant to Tell You This (1994)
 From the Notebooks of Melanin Sun (1995)
 The House You Pass on the Way (1997)
 If You Come Softly (1998)
 Lena (1999)
 Miracle's Boys (2000)
 Hush (2002)
 Behind You (2004)
 Beneath a Meth Moon (2012)
 The Letter Q: Queer Writers' Notes to Their Younger Selves (2012) (Contributor)

Illustrated works 

 Martin Luther King, Jr. and His Birthday (nonfiction), illus. Floyd Cooper (1990)
 Book Chase, illus. Steve Cieslawski (1994)
 We Had a Picnic This Sunday Past, illus. Diane Greenseid (1997)
 Sweet, Sweet Memory, illus. Floyd Cooper (2000)
 The Other Side, illus. E. B. Lewis (2001)
 Visiting Day, illus. James Ransome (2002)
 Our Gracie Aunt, illus. Jon J. Muth (2002)
 Coming on Home Soon, illus. E. B. Lewis (2003)
 Show Way, illus. Hudson Talbott (2006)
 Pecan Pie Baby, illus. Sophie Blackall (2010)
 Each Kindness, illus. E. B. Lewis (2012)
This Is the Rope, illus. James Ransome (2013)
 The Day You Begin, illus. Rafael López (2018)
 The Year We Learned to Fly, illus. Rafael López (2022)
 The World Belonged To Us, illus by Leo Espinoza (2022)

Adaptations

Film
Filmmaker Spike Lee and others made Miracle's Boys into a miniseries, airing in 2005.

Audio recordings
I Hadn't Meant to Tell You This, Recorded Books, 1999
Lena, Recorded Books, 1999
Miracle's Boys, Listening Library, 2001
Locomotion, Recorded Books, 2003
 Show Way, Weston Woods, 2012
 Brown Girl Dreaming, Penguin Audio, 2014
 If You Come Softly, Listening Library, 2018
 Harbor Me, Listening Library, 2018
 The Day You Begin, Listening Library, 2018
 Visiting Day, Listening Library, 2018
 Before Her, part of "The One" series, Brilliance Publishing, 2019
 Red at the Bone, Penguin Audio, 2019

See also

 List of winners of the National Book Award

References

External links

 
 Jacqueline Woodson at glbtq.com
 If You Come Softly at Wikiquote
 Jacqueline Woodson Papers at the University of South Florida
 Jacqueline Woodson at Library of Congress Authorities — with 43 catalog records

1963 births
Living people
20th-century American novelists
20th-century American women writers
21st-century American novelists
21st-century American women writers
African-American children's writers
African-American novelists
American children's writers
American women children's writers
American women novelists
American writers of young adult literature
Children's poets
LGBT African Americans
American LGBT novelists
LGBT people from Ohio
Lambda Literary Award for Children's and Young Adult Literature winners
Lambda Literary Award for Lesbian Fiction winners
American lesbian writers
MacArthur Fellows
MacDowell Colony fellows
Margaret A. Edwards Award winners
National Book Award winners
Newbery Honor winners
Hans Christian Andersen Award for Writing winners
Novelists from New York (state)
Novelists from North Carolina
Novelists from Ohio
People from Nelsonville, Ohio
Women writers of young adult literature
Writers from Brooklyn
Writers from Columbus, Ohio
20th-century African-American women
21st-century African-American women writers
21st-century African-American writers